Methanopyraceae are a family of the Methanopyrales. This family contains only one genus, which contains only one species, Methanopyrus kandleri. It is chemolitoautotrophic and its cells are bar-shaped. It can grow comfortably at a temperature of 98 °C and can survive at temperatures as high as 110 °C, making it the most thermophilic known methanogen. It has been found to live in hydrothermal vents.

References

Further reading

Scientific journals

Scientific books

Scientific databases

External links

Archaea taxonomic families
Euryarchaeota